Bermuda competed at the 2020 Summer Olympics in Tokyo. Originally scheduled to take place from 24 July to 9 August 2020, the Games had been postponed to 23 July to 8 August 2021, because of the COVID-19 pandemic. Since the nation's official debut in 1936, Bermudian athletes have appeared in every edition of the Summer Olympic Games, but did not attend the 1980 Summer Olympics in Moscow because of the nation's support for the US-led boycott.

The first ever gold medal for Bermuda was won by triathlete Flora Duffy.

Medalists

Competitors
The following is the list of number of competitors in the Games.

Rowing

Bermuda qualified one boat in the men's single sculls for the Games by finishing third in the B-final and securing the second of five berths available at the 2021 FISA Americas Olympic Qualification Regatta in Rio de Janeiro, Brazil.

Qualification Legend: FA=Final A (medal); FB=Final B (non-medal); FC=Final C (non-medal); FD=Final D (non-medal); FE=Final E (non-medal); FF=Final F (non-medal); SA/B=Semifinals A/B; SC/D=Semifinals C/D; SE/F=Semifinals E/F; QF=Quarterfinals; R=Repechage

Triathlon

Bermuda entered one triathlete to compete at the Olympics. Remarkably going to her historic fourth Games, Flora Duffy was selected among the top 26 triathletes vying for qualification in the women's event based on the individual ITU World Rankings of 15 June 2021. She won the Gold Medal.

Non-competing sports

Equestrian

Bermuda entered one dressage rider into the Olympic competition by finishing in the top four, outside the group selection, of the individual FEI Olympic Rankings for Groups D and E (North, Central, and South America), marking the country's recurrence to the sport after an eight-year absence. The quota was later withdrawn, following an injury of Annabelle Collins' main horse Joyero and a failure to obtain minimum eligibility requirements (MER) aboard a new horse Chuppy Checker.

See also
Bermuda at the 2019 Pan American Games
Bermuda at the 2020 Summer Paralympics

References

Nations at the 2020 Summer Olympics
2020
2021 in Bermudian sport